Pachypeza joda is a species of beetle in the family Cerambycidae. It was described by Dillon and Dillon in 1945.

References

Agapanthiini
Beetles described in 1945